Peddapanjani also called panjani sathram  is a small town in Chittoor district of the Indian state of Andhra Pradesh. it is  also native mandal of tdp minister sri N. Amaranadha reddy.It is the mandal headquarters of Peddapanjani mandal.

References 

Villages in Chittoor district
Mandal headquarters in Chittoor district